James Stephen Hagan Sr. (February 18, 1938 – May 4, 2021) was an American basketball player. He was an All-American college player at Tennessee Tech before earning similar honors with the Amateur Athletic Union's Phillips 66ers.

From Glendale, Kentucky, Hagan played for Tennessee Tech from 1957 to 1960. While there, the  center became one of the best players in program history. The slender big man was known as a prolific scorer with a deft shooting touch, particularly from the free throw line. In his junior season, Hagan used his offensive skill very effectively in coach John Oldham's high post offense. Hagan averaged 28.8 points per game and engaged in a highly publicized national scoring race with eventual scoring leader Oscar Robertson. At the close of the season, Hagan was named first-team All-Ohio Valley Conference and a third-team All-American by the Associated Press.

In his senior season, Hagan's scoring average dipped to 24.3 points per game. He was again named All-OVC and was the only unanimous choice for the squad. Hagan left Tennessee Tech holding a number of records - including total career points (1,539, since eclipsed), total career rebounds (1,108), season scoring average (28.8 points per game in 1958–59) and career scoring average (21.1 points per game). He was inducted into the Tennessee Tech athletic Hall of Fame in 1979 and his jersey has been retired by the school.

Following the close of his college career, Hagan was selected by the Minneapolis Lakers in the third round of the 1960 NBA draft (18th pick overall). Concerned that his thin frame might have trouble in a league marked with burly big men, he instead chose to join the Phillips 66ers of the National Industrial Basketball League. With the 66ers, Hagan won an Amateur Athletic Union (AAU) championship in 1962 and was named an AAU All-American in 1963 and 1964 before retiring to focus on his business career with Phillips.

Hagan died on May 4, 2021.

References

1938 births
2021 deaths
All-American college men's basketball players
American men's basketball players
Basketball players from Kentucky
Centers (basketball)
Minneapolis Lakers draft picks
People from Hardin County, Kentucky
Phillips 66ers players
Tennessee Tech Golden Eagles men's basketball players